(English: The Dream) is a Greenlandic novel. It was published in 1914, and it was the first novel written entirely in the Greenlandic language. It is commonly seen as one of the originating texts in Greenlandic literature.

Background 
In his youth, was a proponent of the  movement, which sought to reawaken the Greenlandic people as a nation and deepen Christian faith. At the time of the novel's publication, the writing of songs was prominent in Greenlandic cultural consciousness, and a significant debate was being held: As Danish eskimologist Inge Kleivan put it, "does identity have to be based on the traditional hunting culture or is the Greenlandic language the most important qualification for being a Greenlander?".

Publication 
Mathias Storch published the novel in 1914, and it was the first published in the Greenlandic language. It is characterised as a Bildungsroman story, set in the early 1900s, which describes the need for Greenlanders to at once deepen their Christian faith, while also seeking to diversify their knowledge. The end of the novel depicts its main character having a dream of a Greenlandic future defined by an entrance into modernity, where Greenland experiences elections and engages in industrial fishing. It is influenced by the  movement, and unlike the Greenlandic cultural milieu of the time, does not take the position that a pre-Christian Greenland was favorable to Christianisation.

Since then, it has been republished several times in Greenlandic, including in serialized, original, and new orthographic forms. The novel has commonly been referred to as one of the progenitors of Greenlandic literature, which often developed similarly to Danish literature. According to literary scholars Kristin Lorentsen and Jakob Stougaard-Nielsen, Singnagtugaq was the most influential piece of Greenlandic literature until Ole Korneliussen published  (Danish: , English: The Pillar of Salt) in 1999. Its imagination of an alternative future is similar to fellow Greenalandic author Frederik Nielsen's 1934 novel  (English: Thomas), though they are quite different in what they imagine.

References

Citations

Bibliography

 
 
 
 
 
 
 

1914 novels
20th-century Danish novels
Greenlandic literature